José Nascimento is a South African human rights lawyer who has been involved in promoting many humanitarian causes such as East Timor, Burma, and Western Sahara. In 1999 he was an international electoral observer for the UN referendum in East Timor and was also an electoral observer during the last South African National elections.

Many of his cases have been reported in the local and international media, such as the Mido Macia, the taxi driver that was dragged by the police van, Robert McBride a prominent political figure in South Africa, on different occasions and the South African Police dog case, not to mention his fight against Xenophobia.

He has received a number of international awards namely the Liberal Professional of the year of the Portuguese diaspora, awarded by the Portuguese government, the Gold Medal of Merit awarded by the Portuguese government in 2013 and the Portuguese Presidential Order of Merit awarded in 2014 together with the rank and title of "Comendador".

References

20th-century South African lawyers
South African people of Portuguese descent
Living people
Year of birth missing (living people)
21st-century South African lawyers